Jacek Krukowski (born 25 August 1969) is a Polish equestrian. He competed in two events at the 1992 Summer Olympics.

References

1969 births
Living people
Polish male equestrians
Olympic equestrians of Poland
Equestrians at the 1992 Summer Olympics
People from Kwidzyn